French military forces were stationed in Germany after the surrender of Germany at the conclusion of the Second World War. France was one of four powers allocated an occupation zone. The French zone of occupation (occupation forces in Germany) existed from the end of the war until 10 August 1949. Subsequently, the French military stationed forces in Germany (FFA) with headquarters in Baden-Baden during the period of the Cold War.

The makeup of the FFA during the period 1950-1990 varied according to the demands being made on French military forces serving elsewhere. For example, the presence of large numbers of Algerian Muslims, both volunteers and conscripts, in the French Army at the beginning of the Algerian War in 1954 raised increasing concerns regarding divided loyalties and the danger of defection with weapons. Accordingly, the majority of Algerian tirailleur (infantry) units were deployed to Germany, replacing Metropolitan French troops for service in North Africa.

The Franco-German Brigade was created on 12 January 1989.

On 30 August 1993, with the end of the Cold War and the collapse of the Soviet Union, the designation of these forces changed to "French Forces stationed in Germany" (FFSA) and most of the forces were withdrawn to France or disbanded. Following another reorganization in 1999, the designation of the forces changed again and became known as the "French Forces and Civilian Elements stationed in Germany" (FFECSA).

See also

 British Army of the Rhine

Citations

Sources
 
 F. Roy Willis, The French in Germany, Stanford University Press, Stanford California, 1962.

Army units and formations of France
Allied occupation of Germany
France–Germany military relations
Military units and formations established in 1945
Military units and formations disestablished in 1993